Martha's Vineyard Sign Language (MVSL) was a village sign-language that was once widely used on the island of Martha's Vineyard from the early 18th century to 1952. It was used by both deaf and hearing people in the community; consequently, deafness was not a barrier to participation in public life. Deaf people who signed Martha's Vineyard Sign Language were extremely independent.

The language was able to thrive because of the unusually high percentage of deaf islanders and because deafness was a recessive trait, which meant that almost anyone might have both deaf and hearing siblings. In 1854, when the island's deaf population peaked, an average of one person in 155 was deaf, while the United States national average was one in about 5,730. In the town of Chilmark, which had the highest concentration of deaf people on the island, the average was 1 in 25; at one point, in a section of Chilmark called Squibnocket, as much as 1 in 4 of the population of 60 was deaf.

Sign language on the island declined when the population migrated to the mainland. There are no fluent signers of MVSL today. Katie West, the last deaf person born into the island's sign-language tradition, died in 1952, though there were a few elderly residents still able to recall MVSL when researchers started examining the language in the 1980s. Linguists are working to save the language, but their task is difficult because they cannot experience MVSL firsthand.

Origins 
Hereditary deafness had appeared on Martha's Vineyard by 1714. The ancestry of most of the deaf population of Martha's Vineyard can be traced to a forested area in the south of England known as the Weald—specifically the part of the Weald in the county of Kent. Martha's Vineyard Sign Language (MVSL) may be descended from a hypothesized sign language of that area in the 16th century, now referred to as Old Kent Sign Language. Families from a Puritan community in the Kentish Weald emigrated to the Massachusetts Bay Colony in British America in the early 17th century, and many of their descendants later settled on Martha's Vineyard. The first deaf person known to have settled there was Jonathan Lambert, a carpenter and farmer, who moved there with his wife—who was not deaf—in 1694. By 1710, the migration had virtually ceased, and the endogamous community that was created contained a high incidence of hereditary deafness that persisted for over 200 years.

In the town of Chilmark, which had the highest concentration of deaf people on the island, the average was 1 in 25; at one point, in a section of Chilmark called Squibnocket, as much as 1 in 4 of the population of 60 was deaf. By the 18th century there was a distinct Chilmark Sign Language. In the 19th century, this was influenced by French Sign Language, and evolved into MVSL in the 19th and 20th centuries. From the late 18th to the early 20th century, virtually everybody on Martha's Vineyard possessed some degree of fluency in the language.

Deaf migration to the mainland 
In the early 19th century, a new educational philosophy began to emerge on the mainland, and the country's first school for the deaf opened in 1817 in Hartford, Connecticut (now called the American School for the Deaf). Many of the deaf children of Martha's Vineyard enrolled there, taking their sign language with them. The language of the teachers was French Sign Language, and many of the other deaf students used their own home-sign systems. This school became known as the birthplace of the deaf community in the United States, and the different sign systems used there, including MVSL, merged to become American Sign Language or ASL—now one of the largest community languages in the country.

As more deaf people remained on the mainland, and others who returned brought with them deaf spouses they met there (whose hearing loss may not have been due to the same hereditary cause), the line of hereditary deafness began to diminish. At the outset of the 20th century, the previously isolated community of fishers and farmers began to see an influx of tourists that would become a mainstay in the island's economy. Jobs in tourism were not as deaf-friendly as fishing and farming had been, and as intermarriage and migration joined the people of Martha's Vineyard to the mainland, the island community grew to resemble the wider community there more and more.

The last deaf person born into the island's sign-language tradition, Katie West, died in 1952. A few elderly residents were able to recall MVSL as recently as the 1980s when research into the language began. Indeed, when Oliver Sacks subsequently visited the island after reading a book on the subject, he noted that a group of elderly islanders talking together dropped briefly into sign language then back into speech.

Life as a deaf person on Martha's Vineyard 

Although the people who were dependent on MVSL were different, they still did the same activities as the typical Martha's Vineyard resident would. Deaf people would work both complex and simple jobs, attend island events, and participate within the community. In contrast to some other deaf communities around the world, they were treated as typical people. Deaf people living in rural Mexico have a similar community, but few hearing people live there permanently. Other deaf communities are often isolated from the hearing population; the Martha's Vineyard deaf community of that period is exceptional in its integration into the general population.

Deaf MVSL users were not excluded by the rest of society at Martha's Vineyard, but they certainly faced challenges due to their deafness. Marriage between a deaf person and a hearing person was extremely difficult to maintain, even though both could use MVSL. For this reason, the deaf usually married the deaf, raising the degree of inbreeding even beyond that of the general population of Martha's Vineyard. This high rate of deaf-deaf marriages increased the deaf population within the community over time, as all offspring of such couples inherited their parents' shared recessive deafness trait and were also congenitally deaf. The MVSL users often associated closely, helping and working with each other to overcome other issues caused by deafness. They entertained at community events, teaching hearing youngsters more MVSL. The sign language was spoken and taught to hearing children as early as their first years to help them communicate with the many deaf people they would encounter in school. Lip movement, hand gestures, mannerisms, and facial expressions were all studied. There were even separate schools specifically for learning MVSL. Hearing people sometimes signed even when there were no deaf people present. For example, children signed behind a schoolteacher's back, adults signed to one another during church sermons, farmers signed to their children across a wide field, and fishermen signed to each other from their boats across the water where the spoken word would not carry.

Decline 
Martha's Vineyard Sign Language declined after the opening of the American School for the Deaf. Although students from Martha's Vineyard influenced the creation of American Sign Language with contributions from MVSL when they returned home, they brought ASL usage back with them, and MVSL faded. Additionally, as transportation became easier in the 19th century, the influx of hearing people meant that more genetic diversity was introduced, and hereditary deafness was no longer commonplace. The last person in the line of hereditary deafness of Martha's Vineyard was Katie West, who died in 1952. Following her death, Oliver Sacks noted in the 1980s that some elderly hearing residents of the island could remember a few signs, but the language truly died out after this point.

Resurgence of Sign Language on Martha's Vineyard 
In recent years there has been a push to reintroduce American sign language into the Island's culture. A Martha's Vineyard resident, Lynn Thorp, began her mission to revive ASL in the early 2000s with the ultimate goal of reinstating ASL as a second language. After studying the language through references such as Everyone Here Spoke Sign Language by Ellen Groce, and a series of 1989 teachings called "Interax", Thorp began meeting with fellow Vineyard residents every week to practice sign language together. About a decade later, Thorp began teaching classes regularly at local community centers. Recently, the Edgartown Elementary School has adopted ASL into their regular curriculum, and other Martha's Vineyard Public Schools are soon to follow.

In popular culture 
Show Me a Sign by Ann Clare LeZotte is a middle grade novel about the thriving deaf community living on Martha's Vineyard in the early part of the 19th century. In the novel deaf and hearing characters successfully use Martha's Vineyard Sign Language to communicate with each other.

See also 

Adamorobe Sign Language
Al-Sayyid Bedouin Sign Language
Founder effect
List of extinct languages of North America
Kata Kolok
Nicaraguan Sign Language
Yucatec Maya Sign Language

References

Further reading 
 
 

Extinct languages of North America
Martha's Vineyard
Village sign languages
American Sign Language
Languages of Massachusetts
Articles containing video clips
Languages extinct in the 1950s
Languages attested from the 18th century
Extinct sign languages
Sign languages of the United States